Stanhopea intermedia is a species of orchid - endemic to southwestern Mexico.

References

External links 

intermedia
Endemic orchids of Mexico
Flora of Southwestern Mexico
Plants described in 1898